This is a list of current and confirmed prospective destinations that AirAsia and its subsidiaries Indonesia AirAsia, Thai AirAsia, Philippines AirAsia, AirAsia X, Thai AirAsia X and AirAsia India are flying to, as of  . Due to the coronavirus pandemic, the route list (especially for international destinations) may not be up to date, however, may resume once trading conditions permit. Tony Fernandes the CEO of AirAsia, remains hopeful to resume a significant portion of its previous destinations with adjusted frequencies. However, due to the low-cost model of the business, this would be unlikely and it is possible that a significant number destinations may be terminated to optimise route efficiency. AirAsia has 180 flights daily, not including its subsidiaries airlines. AirAsia X has 21 flights daily.



Destinations

Note - ''Green background indicates carriers active on given routes, grey background indicates terminated services.

References

External links 
 Interactive AirAsia Route Map (inactive from 11/11/2017)

Lists of airline destinations
AirAsia